Cutler is an unincorporated community located in the Town of Cutler, Juneau County, Wisconsin, United States.

Description
The community was named in honor of Charles "Fred" Cutler, who had been the Juneau County clerk for thirty years.

References

External links

Unincorporated communities in Juneau County, Wisconsin
Unincorporated communities in Wisconsin